The Chimes is the only studio album by Scottish dance music act The Chimes, released in 1990. Featuring singer Pauline Henry on vocals, the album includes their cover of U2's "I Still Haven't Found What I'm Looking For", which reached number six in the UK Singles Chart, along with their other top 40 hit "Heaven", which reached number 24.  The album was certified silver in the UK, and gold in Australia.

Critical reception

In a retrospective review for AllMusic, Steve Mason gave the album four and a half out of five stars, calling it a "completely solid and credible album". He described lead singer Pauline Henry's voice as being "expressive but controlled" and "powerful without resorting to the tiresome trills and oversinging of so many of her R&B contemporaries". He also said that the multi-instrumentalist band members and producers James Locke and Michael Peden "combine pop, dance, and soul influences into a seamless, sleekly danceable blend."

2016 re-issue
A remastered, expanded 2-CD version of the album was released in September 2016, containing the original album plus B-sides, remixes, and two newly-recorded versions of "Heaven" by Pauline Henry.

Track listing
All tracks written by The Chimes, except where noted.

Note
Tracks 11 and 12 are included on the CD version only.

Personnel
Adapted from the album's liner notes.
All music performed by The Chimes (Pauline Henry, Mike Peden, James Locke), except:
Eric Bazilian – harp, bass melodica (track 9)
Luís Jardim – percussion (track 5)
Simon Law – piano (tracks 3, 4, 5 & 8)
The Reggae Philharmonic Orchestra – strings (tracks 5 & 8)
Frank Ricotti – vibes (track 6)
Ralph Schuckett – piano (track 9), synthesizers (track 9)
Tony Spiker – conga (tracks 3 & 8)
Phil Todd – flute (track 6)
Pete Wingfield – piano (tracks 1, 2, 6, 7 & 10)
Peter Wood – synthesizers (track 9)
All tracks programmed by Mel Wesson
Additional drum programming by Sammy Merendino (track 9)
Photography by Enrique Badulescu & Steve Rapport
Design by Peter Barrett & Andrew Biscomb

Charts and certifications

Weekly charts

Year-end charts

Certifications

References

External links
The Chimes at Discogs

1990 debut albums
The Chimes (Scottish band) albums
CBS Records albums
Albums produced by Nellee Hooper
Albums produced by Mike Peden